Robin Thomas Grossman (born February 12, 1949), known professionally as Robin Thomas, is an American film, television and theater actor, and sculptor. He changed his professional name to his birth name in 2014, but returned to using Robin Thomas in 2015.

Career
Thomas' best-known television roles are as Mark Singleton in Another World (1983–85), and as Geoffrey Wells on Who's the Boss?. He portrayed Paul Kellogg in The Mommies, Nate's father in Life Unexpected, and had recurring roles on the television series Murphy Brown, Hunter, Matlock, and The Division. He has also appeared in Misfits of Science, Midnight Caller, Party of Five, Pacific Blue, Queer as Folk, NCIS, NCIS: Los Angeles, CSI: Crime Scene Investigation, CSI: Miami, CSI: NY, Criminal Minds, Franklin & Bash, Castle, Manhattan, Fuller House, and Crazy Ex-Girlfriend, among others. He also appeared in such films as Pacific Rim, About Last Night..., The Contender, Summer School, and The Banger Sisters.

Personal life
Born in Carlisle, Pennsylvania, Thomas attended the Mercersburg Academy and graduated in 1967. Thomas earned a BFA from Carnegie-Mellon University where he was accepted into the drama department as an actor. Transitioning in his junior year to the Sociology department, he graduated from the Art department with a major in sculpture. Upon graduation he moved to New York.

Thomas spent his early years in New York as a carpenter, specializing in renovations of restaurants and apartments. He also worked as a sculptor, creating kinetic works employing plexiglas, stainless steel, teflon, water, oil, air, pumps, motors, and lights. His works were exhibited at the Huntsville Museum of Art, The Three Rivers Arts Festival, and at various galleries in SoHo. He was invited to create works for Tiffany's windows for two consecutive years. While in New York, he also started a construction company renovating lofts and apartments to augment his income as an artist.

Film

Television

References

External links

1949 births
Male actors from Pennsylvania
American male film actors
American male stage actors
American male soap opera actors
American male television actors
American sculptors
Living people
People from Carlisle, Pennsylvania
20th-century American male actors
21st-century American male actors